Willie Carrick (born 26 September 1952) is an Irish former footballer who played in the Football League for Luton Town.

Born in Dublin, Carrick signed for Manchester United as a professional in September 1970. He spent two years at the club before being allowed to join Luton Town without making an appearance for the Red Devils. In one season with Luton, Carrick made just four league appearances, before being transferred to non-league Chelmsford City in 1973.

External links
Profile at redStat

1952 births
Living people
Association footballers from Dublin (city)
Republic of Ireland association footballers
Association football goalkeepers
Manchester United F.C. players
Luton Town F.C. players
Chelmsford City F.C. players
English Football League players